The Horatio Tower House is a historic house at 71 Pleasant Street in Worcester, Massachusetts.  It is one of the few relatively intact surviving instances of Italianate styling on the west side of the city.  This two story frame house was built for Horatio Tower, a local builder whose work included the American Antiquarian Society hall and Mechanics Hall.  Although the building has some Greek Revival features (such as the corner pilasters), its significant Italianate features include the deep cornice with brackets, and a front entry porch supported by Corinthian columns and a similarly styled roof.

The house was listed on the National Register of Historic Places in 1980.

See also
National Register of Historic Places listings in northwestern Worcester, Massachusetts
National Register of Historic Places listings in Worcester County, Massachusetts

References

Italianate architecture in Massachusetts
Houses completed in 1848
Houses in Worcester, Massachusetts
National Register of Historic Places in Worcester, Massachusetts
Houses on the National Register of Historic Places in Worcester County, Massachusetts